Gharabaghi or Qarabaghi (lit. "from Karabakh") is a common surname in Iran, and to a lesser extent in Azerbaijan.

People
 Abbas Gharabaghi (1918 - 2000), last chief of staff of the Iranian armed forces as well as deputy commander-in-chief of the Iranian Imperial Army during the rule of the Pahlavi dynasty.
 Parviz Fattah Gharabaghi (born 1961) Iranian politician, former member of Revolutionary Guard and former minister of energy in Mahmoud Ahmadinejad's first cabinet from 2005 to 2009.

References

Persian-language surnames
Azerbaijani-language surnames
Nagorno-Karabakh